The Valentine Wilson House was a historic residence in Madison County, Ohio, United States.

Born in Harpers Ferry, Virginia in 1785, he moved with his family to Kentucky in 1790 and to Ohio in 1802; they settled in Greene County, where he married the former Eleanor Judy in 1806. In 1816, the Wilson family moved to Madison County and purchased land along the trail that later became the National Road; here, Valentine quickly became a prosperous farmer. Besides tilling the soil, he engaged in industry, establishing the county's first brickyard. His excellent presence of mind and understanding of other men's intentions enabled him to build and preserve his wealth: upon one occasion, he was accosted by highwaymen while carrying $7,000 on his person, but he kept his money by calmly telling the robbers only of the small coin that he carried in his pocket. He was by far the wealthiest man in Madison County at the time.

Wilson built his home in 1820 on the northern side of the future National Road.  Constructed of brick and wood, it was a two-part structure: the main portion of the house was a two-story brick hall-and-parlor design, while later additions were single-story structures that combined brick and wood.  Into the late 20th century, it remained little unchanged and retained the sense of an elaborate early 19th-century farmhouse far more strongly than many slightly later residences, which generally were erected with heavy vernacular influences.

In 1973, the Valentine Wilson House was listed on the National Register of Historic Places.  Key to its inclusion was its well preserved architecture, which included such elements as fine original details.  It was the first place in Madison County to be accorded this distinction, but designation as a historic site has not succeeded in ensuring its survival: the house has since been destroyed.

References

Houses completed in 1820
Demolished buildings and structures in Ohio
Hall and parlor houses
Houses on the National Register of Historic Places in Ohio
Houses in Madison County, Ohio
National Register of Historic Places in Madison County, Ohio